Robbie Williams (born 28 December 1986) is an English professional snooker player.

Williams turned professional in 2012 after qualifying in Event 3 of the Q School and gained a two-year tour card for the 2012/13 and 2013/14 snooker seasons.

Amateur career 

He has represented England in a number of amateur competitions, including the World Under 21 Championships in India. Williams has won the Merseyside Open five times.

In 2010, he won the Paul Hunter English Open. In June 2011, he reached the last 16 of a PTC event, beating Peter Ebdon, Nick Jennings and Ali Carter, before losing to Graeme Dott. In March 2012, he was part of the England team who claimed victory in the European Team Championships. In May, he qualified for the main snooker tour by coming through the third Qualifying School event with a 4–3 win over Mitchell Mann in his final match, with a break of 102 in the deciding frame.

Professional career

Debut season 

Williams' first match as a professional was in qualifying for the 2012 Wuxi Classic, where he lost 2–5 to Thepchaiya Un-Nooh. He won two matches, but lost in the third qualifying round three times during the season in the ranking events. Williams played in all ten of the minor-ranking Players Tour Championship events, with his best finish coming in the first European Tour Event where he beat established players Tom Ford, Robert Milkins and Jamie Cope, before losing a last frame decider to Mark Selby. It was largely down to this result which saw Williams finish 47th on the PTC Order of Merit. His season ended when he was beaten 7–10 by Li Yan in the first round of World Championship Qualifying, which saw him finish his first year on tour ranked world number 79.

2013/14 season 
Williams' enjoyed a superb spell of play in October 2013. It began at the minor-ranking Ruhr Open where he won five games to reach the semi-finals, but he lost 4–0 against Mark Allen. At the Indian Open he beat Shaun Murphy to qualify and received a bye through the first round due to Kyren Wilson's withdrawal. Williams then swept into his first ranking event semi-final with the loss of just one frame as he eliminated Andrew Higginson (4–1), Mike Dunn (4–0) and Anthony McGill (4–0). A last four meeting with Ding Junhui followed and it proved a match too far for Williams as he was beaten 4–1. His aforementioned semi-final run in Germany helped him to finish 26th on the European Order of Merit, just one spot short of qualifying for the Finals.

In World Championship qualifying, Williams earned wins over Lü Haotian, Liu Chuang and Pankaj Advani to face Fergal O'Brien for a spot in snooker's biggest event for the first time. Williams produced a superb comeback from 7–2 down to force a deciding frame at 9–9, which he led by 57 points. However, O'Brien then compiled a break of 57 to level the scores meaning a respotted black was required to settle the match which Williams duly potted to seal his first round berth. Williams played world number one Neil Robertson and was beaten 10–2. He ended the season in top 64 of the world rankings for the first time as he was placed 62nd.

2014/15 season 
Williams made his debut at a Chinese ranking event at the 2014 Wuxi Classic and lost 5–1 to Mark Selby in the first round. He soon played in his second by qualifying for the International Championship, but lost 6–4 against Stuart Bingham. Williams' only win at the venue stage of a ranking event this season came at the UK Championship, with a 6–4 victory over Sam Baird, before missing a good chance when 5–4 up against Ricky Walden to be ultimately knocked out 6–5.

Williams qualified for his second successive World Championship courtesy of beating Lee Page 10–3, Dechawat Poomjaeng 10–8 and Michael Holt 10–5. He edged the first session against Bingham 5–4, but went on to be defeated 10–7. Williams finished the season with a career high world ranking of 50th.

2015/16 season 
The first ranking event Williams could reach in the 2015–16 season was the International Championship and he was beaten 6–5 by Ben Woollaston in the first round. At the UK Championship he overcame both Mitchell Mann and Joe Perry 6–3 and described the latter as the best win of his career, with Perry stating that his opponent's style and speed of play was a joke. Williams went on to lose 6–3 against Matthew Selt in the third round. He reached the second round of the Welsh Open and was edged out 4–3 by Barry Hawkins. Williams qualified for the World Championship for the third year in a row by beating Gareth Allen 10–7, Mark Joyce 10–4 and Anthony Hamilton 10–9. Even though Williams said afterwards that he felt like the worst player in the tournament, he led Ricky Walden (a player who had lost in the final of the previous two ranking events) 5–4 and 7–5, but would ultimately lose 10–8.

2016/17 season 

At the 2016 Paul Hunter Classic, Williams defeated Simon Lichtenberg 4–1, Joe Perry 4–2 and Andrew Higginson 4–3, but was then heavily beaten 4–0 by David Grace. In the third round of the Northern Ireland Open he levelled at 3–3 after being 3–0 down to Yan Bingtao, before losing the deciding frame. At the UK Championship, Williams overcame Akani Songsermsawad 6–1 and then lost 6–2 to Ali Carter. Wins over Grace, Andy Hicks and Michael White at the Welsh Open saw him reach the last 16 of a ranking event for the second time this season and he was whitewashed 4–0 by Stuart Bingham.

2017/18 season 
Williams put on one of the most significant showings of his career to reach the quarter-finals of the 2017 International Championship. He defeated Joe Perry and Neil Robertson along the way, but eventually lost out to Mark Selby.

Performance and rankings timeline

Career finals

Pro-am finals: 2 (1 title)

References

External links 

 Snooker Database
Robbie Williams at worldsnooker.com

1986 births
Living people
English snooker players
People from Wallasey